Cyuve is a town and sector in the Musanze district of Northern Province, Rwanda.

Populated places in Rwanda